Kazys Varnelis may refer to:

 Kazys Varnelis (artist) (1917–2010), Lithuanian abstract painter who spent most of his adult life in the United States
 Kazys Varnelis (historian) (born 1967), American historian and theorist of architecture, specialising in network culture